Arch Nemesis is the third solo studio album by American rapper and record producer Benzino. It was released independently on February 22, 2005 via ZNO Records. Production was handled mostly by Benzino's production team Hangmen 3, as well as Reefa, Diego Morales, Gizz, L.E.S., M. Brown, Nomad, Scott Storch, S. Joyner, StreetRunner, the Beat Brokers, Troy Bell and Vincent Herbert. It features guest appearances from the Untouchables, 2Pac, 3 Down, Ekko, Faheim, Freddie Foxxx, Gambino, Huddy, Lil' Jon, Miss Lilli, Scarface, Yaga & Mackie. The album peaked at number 117 on the Billboard 200, number 39 on the Top R&B/Hip-Hop Albums, number 19 on the Rap Albums and number 12 on the Independent Albums.

It spawned a few promotional singles, including “Look Into My Eyes”, which responded with lyrics and an accompanying music video to Eminem's “Like Toy Soldiers” during then lull of their ongoing feud. The album also containts a song “Trying to Make It Through”, which brought the long lost 2Pac verse taken from Freddie Foxxx's 1994 song "Don't Fuck wit a Killa" off of his shelved album Crazy Like a Foxxx. The song "Noche de Estrellas" uses as same beat as "Hoola Hoop" from Redemption. The bonus song "Last Days Calling" is arranged in heavy metal genre.

Track listing

Charts

References

External links

2005 albums
Benzino albums
Albums produced by Reefa
Albums produced by Scott Storch
Albums produced by Vincent Herbert
Albums produced by L.E.S. (record producer)